"Dreamers" is a 2022 song by South Korean singer Jungkook, a member of the boy band BTS. Part of the 2022 FIFA World Cup official soundtrack, the song was released on November 20 to coincide with the first match of that year's FIFA World Cup and its opening ceremony.

Live performances and release 
On November 19, Jungkook's agency Big Hit Music announced via Weverse his participation in the opening ceremony. The next day, FIFA's official Twitter account shared a video of the singer teasing his upcoming performance. The performance featured Jungkook in an all black suit surrounded by background dancers, being joined by Fahad Al Kubaisi wearing Qatari clothing midway through the performance.

Music video 
A music video for the Fahad Al Kubaisi version of the song was announced, with a scheduled release date of November 22 with the video being released on FIFA's YouTube channel.

Charts

Weekly charts

Monthly charts

Year-end charts

References 

2022 songs
2022 singles
2101 Records singles
BTS songs
FIFA World Cup official songs and anthems